Bagnolo Piemonte (Occitan Banhuel, Piedmontese and  French Bagneul) is a comune (municipality) in the Province of Cuneo in the Italian region Piedmont, located about  southwest of Turin and about  northwest of Cuneo. The ski resort and village Rucas is within the commune.

Bagnolo Piemonte borders the following municipalities: Barge, Bibiana, Cavour, Crissolo, Luserna San Giovanni, Ostana, Rorà, and Villar Pellice.

References

Cities and towns in Piedmont